Miklós Szentkuthy (born Miklós Pfisterer; 2 June 1908 – 18 July 1988) was one of the most prolific Hungarian writers of the 20th century. His works include numerous novels, essays, translations, and a voluminous diary spanning the years 1930–1988. As the author of masterpieces such as Prae, the epic 10-volume St. Orpheus Breviary, Chapter on Love and Towards the One and Only Metaphor, he is recognized as one of the most significant Hungarian writers of the 20th century. To date, his works have been translated into English, French, Spanish, Portuguese, Romanian, Slovak, and Turkish.

Style
Szentkuthy composed an oeuvre both imposing and complex, centered on the conflict between art and life, or the aspiration for holiness and eroticism. It includes fictionalized biographies of musicians such as Handel, Haydn, and Mozart, artists like Dürer and Brunelleschi, writers Goethe and Cicero, and historical figures Superbus and Luther, etc., written in the form of collections of fragments or notes with a wealth of audacious metaphors. For the experimental side and erudite aspect of his work, he is sometimes compared to the Argentine writer Jorge Luis Borges. However, in My Career, Szentkuthy stated that he "never, in any shape or form, considered Prae to be a work that belonged to an avant-garde. [...] When people pigeonholed the book with ‘surrealism’ and other ‘isms’ I felt a bit like Molière's Bourgeois Gentilhomme, who on being taught the difference between poetry and prose, exclaims in astonishment, 'Good Heavens! For more than forty years I have been speaking prose without knowing it!' It was also on the basis of an honorable misunderstanding of Prae that I was invited to what was catalogued as the avant-garde “European School” – perhaps more to address them as a speaker than a proper member – and there I delivered talks on Dickens, Shakespeare, and a host of old classics, amply demonstrating that what the school fondly imagined were revolutionary innovations had also played a part, to a greater or lesser extent (better too), in the history of the arts."

Works
Szentkuthy was only 26 when he published his debut novel Prae (1934), which he intended to be a panoramic description of European culture of the twenties. Containing little plot or dialogue, the novel consists mostly of philosophical reflections and descriptions of modern interiors. One of the formal innovations of Prae lies in the fragmentary structure of the text. The novel consists of numerous reflections, descriptions, and scenes that are only loosely connected. While in 1934 the novel was received with indifference, today it is recognised as the first fully modernist Hungarian novel.

Szentkuthy's second book, Towards the One and Only Metaphor (1935), is a collection of short diary-like epigrams and reflections; it was intended as a literary experiment to follow the thinking self through the most delicate thoughts and impressions without imposing any direction on it. His next novel, Chapter on Love (1936), marks a shift in his style — the quasi-scientific language of Prae gives way to a baroque prose typical of his later works.

After Chapter on Love, Szentkuthy developed an outline for his St. Orpheus's Breviary, a grandiose cycle of historical novels. Drawing on the tradition of great Encyclopaedic narratives such as Balzac's The Human Comedy and Zola's Rougon-Macquart cycle, Szentkuthy aimed at depicting the totality of two thousand years of European culture. While there are clear parallels between this monumental work and Huysmans, Musil, and Robert Burton, and in ways it is parodic of St. Augustine, Zéno Bianu observed that its method is in part based on Karl Barth's exegetical work. "In 1938, Szentkuthy read the Römerbrief of the famous Protestant exegete Karl Barth, a commentary that is based on an analysis, phrase by phrase, even word by word, of the Epistle to the Romans. Literally enchanted by the effectiveness of this method – 'where, in his words, every epithet puts imagination in motion' – he decided to apply it on the spot to Casanova, which he had just annotated with gusto a German edition in six large volumes." In the years 1939–1942, Szentkuthy published the first six parts of the series: Marginalia on Casanova (1939), Black Renaissance (1939), Escorial (1940), Europa Minor (1941), Cynthia (1941), and Confession and Puppet Show (1942). In the period 1945–1972, due to Communist rule in Hungary, Szentkuthy could not continue Orpheus. Instead he wrote a series of pseudo-biographical novels on Mozart (1957), Haydn (1959), Goethe (1962), Dürer (1966), and Handel (1967) in which he mixed historical facts with elements of fiction and autobiography. He also wrote several historical novels during this time: Liberated Jerusalem, Chronicle Burgonde, Byzance, Wittenberg, in which he put, as he himself said, several micro-Orpheus’.

In 1972 Szentkuthy resumed the Orpheus cycle. Publication of the seventh volume, The Second Life of Sylvester II, turned out to be a success and marked the beginning of Szentkuthy's renaissance. His translation of Joyce's Ulysses (1974) and the second edition of Prae (1980) was followed by the republication of his early works, which brought him widespread recognition in some European countries. Thereafter he wrote two more parts of the Orpheus cycle, Canonized Desperation (1974), and Bloody Donkey (1984). In 1988 he was awarded the Kossuth Prize and the last book that appeared in his lifetime was Frivolities and Confessions (1988), a series of interviews conducted by Lóránt Kabdebó in 1983.

Death
Szentkuthy died in 1988, leaving the final part of Orpheus unfinished. Some fragments of it were published posthumously as In the Footsteps of Eurydice (1993).

Legacy
In the twenty-first century, Szentkuthy is generally acknowledged as one of the major innovative Hungarian novelists of the 20th century. His influence has extended to many contemporary authors, such as Péter Esterházy and Péter Nádas, while some critics consider him a forerunner of postmodernism. At the same time, Szentkuthy's oeuvre remains largely unknown to the wider English-speaking public, though a recent English translation and laudatory reviews in the Guardian, the Los Angeles Review of Books, and Tropes of Tenth Street have considerably remedied that. Additionally, in December 2013, Szentkuthy's Marginalia on Casanova was chosen by Nicholas Lezard of The Guardian as one of the best books of the year. In Europe, Szentkuthy's work has received more widespread and consistent attention, and at least one or more of his works have been translated annually since 1990. Yet, with only one monograph (József J. Fekete, P.O.S.T) and two doctoral theses devoted to his works, he is one of the most under-researched Hungarian writers, but some critics in France and elsewhere regard him to be as significant as Marcel Proust.

The Petőfi Literary Museum in Budapest has an archive of Szentkuthy's manuscripts which contain unpublished work, including approximately 80–100,000 pages of a sealed diary (1930s–1988). The first part of the diary (1930s–1947) opened to researchers in 2013, the 25th anniversary of his death, and the second part (1948–1988) will be opened in 2038. Szentkuthy professed that the diary is his 'real' work, hence the opening of it should prove illuminating.

Awards and honors
 Baumgarten Prize (1948)
 Award of Excellence of the Publisher Europa (March 21, 1975 – for the translation of Ulysses)
 Attila József Prize (1977)
 Order of Labor Gold Degree (1978 – for his remarkable life-work, on the occ. of his 70th birthday) 
 Füst Milán Prize (1982)
 Déry Tibor Prize (1984)
 Award of Excellence from the Publisher Magvető (May 15, 1985 – for Vol. IV of St. Orpheus Breviary, Bloody Donkey)
 Kossuth Prize (April 4, 1988)
 Award of Excellence from Hungarian Radio (June 28, 1988 – for the tr. of Ulysses)
 Elected to be included in the Digitális Irodalmi Akadémia (2013)

Selected bibliography

Novels and novel-essays 
 Prae (1934; 1980; 2004)
 Prae: Vol. 1, trans. Tim Wilkinson (Contra Mundum Press, 2014)
 Prae: Vol. 2, trans. Erika Mihálycsa (Contra Mundum Press, 2022)
 Fejezet a szerelemről (1936; 1984). Chapter on Love, trans. Erika Mihálycsa (Contra Mundum Press, 2020)
 Fekete Orpheus-füzetek (1939–1942). Black Orpheus Booklets; later included in St. Orpheus Breviary
 1. Széljegyzetek Casanovához (1939; 2008). Marginalia on Casanova, trans. Tim Wilkinson (Contra Mundum Press, 2012)
 2. Fekete Reneszánsz (1939). Black Renaissance, trans. Tim Wilkinson (Contra Mundum Press, 2018)
 3. Eszkoriál (1940)
 4. Europa minor (1941)
 5. Cynthia (1941)
 6. Vallomás és bábjáték (1942). Confession and Puppet Show
 Divertimento. Változatok Wolfgang Amadeus Mozart életére (1957; 1976; 1998; 2006). Variations on the Life of W. A. Mozart
 Doktor Haydn (1959; 1979; 2009)
 Burgundi krónika (1959; 1978). Burgundy Chronicle
 Hitvita és nászinduló: Wittenberg, Bizánc (1960). Religious Debate and Wedding March: Wittenberg and Byzantium
 Arc és álarc (1962; 1982). Face and Mask
 Megszabadított Jeruzsálem (1965). Jerusalem Liberated
 Saturnus fia (1966; 1989). Son of Saturn; novel about Albrecht Dürer
 Angyali Gigi (1966). Angelic Gigi; novella
 Händel (1967; 1975).
 Meghatározások és szerepek (1969). Definitions and Roles
 II Szilveszter második élete (1972). The Second Life of Sylvester II
 Szent Orpheus breviáriuma (1973–1984). St. Orpheus Breviary:
Vol. 1 (1973) contains the first four volumes of Black Orpheus Booklets (1. Marginalia on Casanova, 2. Black Renaissance, 3. Eszkoriál, and 4. Europa minor)
Vol. 2 (1973) contains two more volumes of Black Orpheus Booklets (5. Cynthia, 6. Confession and Puppet Show) and 7. The Second Life of Silvester II
Vol. 3 (1974) contains 8. Kanonizált kétségbeesés [Canonized Desperation]
Vol. 4 (1984) contains 9. Véres szamár [Bloody Donkey]
 Szárnyatlan oltárok: Burgundi krónika, Wittenberg (1978). Wingless Altars: Burgundy Chronicle and Wittenberg
 Iniciálék és ámenek (1987). Initials and Amens, collection of shorter prose

Posthumous editions 
 Cicero vándorévei (1990)
 Barokk Róbert (1991; 2002). Baroque Robert
 Saint Orpheus's Breviary Vol. 5 (1993) contains 10. Euridiké nyomán [In the Footsteps of Eurydice]
 Bianca Lanza di Casalanza (1994)
 Nárcisszus tükre (written in 1933, first published in 1995). Narcissus’ Mirror
 Bezárult Európa (2000). Europe Is Closed
 Pendragon és XIII. Apolló (written 1946–1947, publ. 2008). Pendragon and Apollo XIII

Essays 
 Maupassant egy mai író szemével (1968). Maupassant in a Contemporary Writer's Eyes
 Meghatározások és szerepek (Magvető, 1969)
 Múzsák testamentuma (1985). Testament of the Muses

Short stories and other writings 
 Iniciálék és ámenek (Szépirodalmi, 1987).

Diary and memoirs 
 Az egyetlen metafora felé (1935, 1985). Towards the One and Only Metaphor, trans. Tim Wilkinson (Contra Mundum Press, 2013)
 Frivolitások és hitvallások (1988). Frivolities & Confessions
 Ágoston olvasás közben (1993). While Reading Augustine
 Harmonikus tépett lélek (1994). A Harmonious Ripped Soul
 Az alázat kalendáriuma (1998). The Almanac of Humility
 Fájdalmok és titkok játéka (2001). The Play of Pains and Secrets
 Az élet faggatottja (beszélgetések, riportok, interjúk Sz.M.-sal) (2006). An Interrogator of Life: Conversations, Reports, and Interviews with Miklós Szenkuthy

Other 
 Reakitás és irrealitás viszonya Ben Jonson klasszikus naturalizmusában [The Relationship of Reality to Unreality in the Classical Naturalism of Ben Jonson’]; doctoral thesis (1931)
 Égő katedra (Hamvas Intézet, 2001)
 Örök közelség, ezer emlék (Szentkuthy Miklós válogatott dedikációi) [Immortal Proximity, a Thousand Memories (selected dedications by Miklós Szenkuthy] (2007)
 Szentkuthy Miklós válogatott levelezése [Selected Correspondence of Miklós Szenkuthy] (2008)
 Titkok játéka (P.I.M., 2009)

Translations by Szentkuthy into Hungarian

 Az angol irodalom kincsesháza (Budapest: Athenaeum, 1942) Szerk: Halász Gábor, Sz.M. ford: John Lyly, A szerelem veszélyei; Philip Sidney, A szerelem; John Donne, A halálról, és: Van-e Isten?; Sir Thomas Browne, Önmagáról [About Himself—an excerpt from Religio Medici]; John Milton, Az „Areopagiticá”-ból
 Jonathan Swift, Gulliver utazásai (Szépirodalmi, 1952)
 Álszentek cselekedetei (Szépirodalmi, 1953)
 Howard Fast, Spartacus (Szépirodalmi, 1953)
 Howard Fast, Amerikai legenda (Szépirodalmi, 1954)
 Charles Dickens, Twist Olivér (Új Magyar Könyvkiadó, 1955)
 Halldór Laxness, Független emberek (Új Magyar Könyvkiadó, 1955)
 Henry Lawson, A batyu románca (Új Magyar Könyvkiadó, 1956)
 Békedíjas írók (Új Magyar kiadó,1956)
 Mark Twain, Az egymillió fontos bankjegy (Európa, 1957)
 Mark Twain, Emberevés a vonaton (Magvető, 1966)
 Hagyomány és egyéniség (1967)
 Autóbusz és iguána (Európa, 1968)
 Mark Twain, Mennyei utazás (Európa, 1970)
 James Joyce, Ulysses (Európa, 1974)
 Mark Twain, Megszelídítem a kerékpárt (Európa, 1980)
 Az erőd bevétele (Zrínyi kiadó, Bp. 1980). Válogatás a világirodalom legjobb katona-elbeszéléseiből, 1800–1945
 Henry Lawson, Élhetetlen szerelmesek (Európa, 1984)
 Poe és követői. Rémisztő történetek (Lazi kiadó, Szeged, 2002)
 Odüsszeusztól Ulyssesig (Kriterion, Kolozsvár, 2006)

Videos 
 András Jeles, Arc és álarc (Budapest, 1986). A video interview conducted by Pál Réz. This is an excerpt from the original 12–15 hours of footage shot by Jeles. Arc és álarc aired on Hungarian TV, Channel No. 1, in 1991.
 TV Portrait-film (1983)

Archive 
The Miklós Szentkuthy Foundation Archive, held by the Petőfi Literary Museum, contains:
 a 1986 video interview (the raw material comprises 12–15 hours),
 a collection of photographs related to Szentkuthy's life (thousands of photos from his grandparents' generation to the death of the writer),
 thousands of bibliographical items: book reviews, critiques, etc. (from 1931 to the present day),
 approx. 200 hours of audio cassettes (1968–present) and VHS tapes (1982 to the present day).

Further reading

Literary reviews

 Numéro spécial de la revue littéraire hongroise: „Magyar Műhely” consacré entière-ment à M.Szentkuthy (édité à Paris, 1973)
 Numéro spécial de la revue littéraire hongroise: „Thélème”, consacré à Miklós Szentkuthy (Printemps 1988)
 Numéro spécial de la revue littéraire hongroise: "Orpheus", consacré entièrement à M. Szentkuthy (1994)
 Europe, No. 868–869. Un bloc sur Miklós Szentkuthy (Paris, 2001)
 Numéro  spécial de la revue littéraire hongroise: „Forrás”, consacré à Szentkuthy (Mars 2002)
 Numéro spécial de la revue littéraire hongroise: «Prae», avec un bloc sur Szentkuthy (Décembre 2008)

Monographs

 Fekete J. József, Olvasat – Forum (Jugoszlávia: Újvidék, 1986)
 Rugási Gyula, Szent Orpheus arcképe – esszékötet (Könyvkiadó: Pesti Szalon, 1992)
 Fekete J. József, Olvasat II. Újabb esszék Szentkuthyról (Jugoszlávia: Sombor Informativni Centar, 1993)
 Bálint Péter, Arcok és álarcok. Esszékötet – Felsőmagyarország kiadó, Miskolc, benne Sz.M.-ről: 79–167. old. (1994)
 Fekete J. József, Széljegyzetek Szentkuthyhoz (Jugoszláviai Magyar Művelődési Társaság: Újvidék, 1998)
 Nagy Pál, Az elérhetetlen szöveg. Prae-palimpszesz – tanulmányok (1999)
 Szentkuthy Miklós: A mítosz mítosza – „In memoriam” sorozat (Rugási Gyula Nap kiadó, 2001)
 Mária Tompa, Égő katedra – Visszaemlékezések Szentkuthy Miklósra – egykori tanítványok vallomásai (Hamvas Intézet, 2001)
 Hegyi Katalin, Szentkuthy Miklós. – biográfia; „Élet-kép” sorozat (Elektra Kiadóház, 2001)
 Molnár Márton, Napló és regény Szentkuthy Miklós műveiben – egyetemi szakdolgozat (Hamvas Intézet, 2003)
 Bálint Péter, Szentkuthy álruhában. Közelítések egy gigantikus napló írójához (Széphalom Könyvműhely, 2003)
 Fekete J. József, P.O.S.T. Szentkuthy Miklós és művei (Újvidék, 2005)
 Parragi Márta, T.Nagy György, Szentkuthy Miklós könyvtára – tanulmány, katalógus, képanyag (PIM, 2008)
 Fekete J. József, Elmélet helyett koreográfia. Újabb Szentkuthy-olvasatok (Nap-kút kiadó, 2010)
 Sikorski Filip, A Genetic Analysis of Miklós Szentkuthy's "Prae" (Helsinki: Unigrafia, 2014), http://urn.fi/URN:ISBN:978-952-10-9795-9
"Miklos Szentkuthy. "Il manierista enciclopedico della Weltliteratur: verso l'unica e sola metafora", in, Il lettore di provincia, rivista semestrale, A. Longo Editore Ravenna, anno XLVII fascicolo 146, gennaio/giugno 2016, pp. 99–104.

References

External links
 Official Miklós Szentkuthy site
 Miklós Szentkuthy Special Issue, Hyperion, Volume VIII, Issue 2, July 18, 2013
 Rainer J. Hanshe, "Entering the World Stage: Miklós Szentkuthy's Ars Poetica," Quarterly Conversation (September 2, 2013)
 Marginalia on Casanova: "Lectio (Saintly Reading)"
 Towards the One and Only Metaphor -- excerpt I
 Towards the One and Only Metaphor -- excerpt II
 Prae: Recollections of My Career -- excerpt I
 Prae: Recollections of My Career -- excerpt II
 The Nile's Nymphs -- excerpt from St. Orpheus Breviary
 Petőfi Irodalmi Múzeum
 Litteraturehongroise Szentkuthy page
 Editions Jose Corti Szentkuthy page
 Zéno Bianu, "Boudoir & Theology"
 Joël Roussiez, "À propos du livre « Robert Baroque » de Miklos Szentkuthy," Contre-feux, revue littéraire, 30 July 2007
 József J. Fekete, "Szentkuthy, the Proteus of Hungarian literature," Hungarian Literature Online, 7.03.2008
 Jose Antonio Garcia Simon, "Miklós Szentkuthy ou la quête de l'oeuvre absolue," Le Courrier, 15 August 2008
 An excerpt from Miklós Szentkuthy's novel on Haydn, Hungarian Literature Online, 4.09.2009
 Ferenc Takács, "A comedy of ideas. Miklós Szentkuthy: Prae," Hungarian Literature Online, 5.01.2012
 Diana Vonnak: "The Gallery of Inner Life. Miklós Szentkuthy: Towards the One and Only Metaphor", Hungarian Literature Online, 21.03.2014
 Miklós Szentkuthy: « Entendez-voir» au Petit Palais, Le Magazine Littéraire (radio broadcasts and more)

1908 births
1988 deaths
Writers from Budapest
Baumgarten Prize winners
Attila József Prize recipients